The 2009 Pacific Coast League season is a season in American baseball.

Teams

Before the season

Affiliation changes 
Before the 2009 season, three PCL teams signed player development contracts (PDC) with different parent clubs.

The Albuquerque Isotopes signed a two-year PDC with the Los Angeles Dodgers through 2010 on September 18, 2008.  The Isotopes had previously been affiliated with the Florida Marlins for six seasons in Albuquerque and four seasons when the franchise was the Calgary Cannons.  This would mark the return of Dodgers prospects to Albuquerque, as Los Angeles was the parent club for the Albuquerque Dukes from 1972-00 when the club moved to Portland and were renamed the Portland Beavers.

The Las Vegas 51s signed a two-year PDC with the Toronto Blue Jays through 2010 on September 21, 2008.  The 51s had previously been affiliated with the Los Angeles Dodgers for eight years.  The relationship between Los Angeles and Las Vegas soured for years because of the lack of sufficient facilities at Cashman Field including the lack of an on site weight room and indoor batting cage.  Toronto becomes the third affiliate in Las Vegas' 28-year history and Las Vegas is only the second triple-A affiliate in Toronto's 33-year history.

The New Orleans Zephyrs signed a two-year PDC with the Florida Marlins through 2010 on September 21, 2008.  The Zephyrs had previously been affiliated with the New York Mets for the past two seasons.  Florida becomes New Orleans' third major league affiliate in five years.

Team changes 
 The Tucson Sidewinders move to Reno, Nevada becoming the Reno Aces.  The team will remain in the Pacific Conference – South Division and will remain the top affiliate of the Arizona Diamondbacks for at least the 2009 season.
 The Oklahoma RedHawks rebranded themselves as the Oklahoma City RedHawks and adopted new logos and team colors.  The Colorado Springs Sky Sox introduced new logos and a new color scheme.

Standings

Tacoma won the PACIFIC SOUTH Division due to a divisional tiebreaker

Playoffs

The Pacific Coast League does not have an exact name for its league's trophy

See also
2009 International League season

External links
Official website of the Pacific Coast League